Newark Vocational High School is a four-year comprehensive community public high school in Newark, in Essex County, New Jersey, United States, serving students in ninth through tenth grades, and operating as part of the Newark Public Schools.

As of the 2021–22 school year, the school had an enrollment of 514 students and 51.0 classroom teachers (on an FTE basis), for a student–teacher ratio of 10.1:1. There were 378 students (73.5% of enrollment) eligible for free lunch and 42 (8.2% of students) eligible for reduced-cost lunch.

CTE programs
Newark Vocational High School offers three CTE routes for its students: Culinary Arts, Hospitality & Tourism, and Graphic Arts Print & Production. . Culinary Arts Students learns in three kitchens including instructional, intermediate, and professional. Newark Vocational has had guest speakers whom are the best in the respective industries speak to the students including Deesha Dyer (Former White House Social Secretary), Bill Yosses (Former White House Pastry Chef), Angella Reid (Former White House Chief Usher), Marshall Jones (Former Sales at Fairmont Hotel / Professor of Hospitality), Aimee Bender (American novelist and short-story writer).

Athletics
The Newark Voacational High School Eagles compete in the Super Essex Conference, which is comprised of public and private high schools in Essex County, and was established following a reorganization of spots leagues in Northern New Jersey under the jurisdiction of the New Jersey State Interscholastic Athletic Association (NJSIAA).

Administration
The school's principal is Lucinda Eason. Her administration team includes the vice principal Richard Kazanjian.

References

External links 
 
 

High schools in Newark, New Jersey
Public high schools in Essex County, New Jersey